Cymindis dachti is a species of ground beetle in the subfamily Harpalinae. It was described by Jedlicka in 1968.

References

dachti
Beetles described in 1968